Willum Þór Þórsson (born 17 March 1963) is a former football player and manager and politician.

From 2013 to 2016, he served on the Althing, the Icelandic parliament, for the Progressive Party, and is currently a member of parliament since 2017. He holds a Master's degree in Microeconomics from the University of Copenhagen and used to teach economics at Menntaskólinn í Kópavogi.

Playing career
Willum began his career at KR before moving on to Breiðablik and later Þróttur where he started his manager career.

He represented Iceland at youth level both in basketball and football.

Managerial career
Willum led Þróttur to Iceland's top league, the Úrvalsdeild in 1997. The wait had been long as Þróttur last played at the top level in 1985. In 2000, he became the manager of Haukar, and in 2002, he was appointed manager of KR and led them to two successive championships in 2002 and 2003. In 2004 KR finished without a title and Þórsson's contract was not renewed. He took charge of Valur who had just been promoted to the Úrvalsdeild and finished the 2005 season in 2nd place after champions FH.

Valur won the 2005 Icelandic Cup with a 1–0 victory over Fram. In 2006, Valur ended the season in 3rd place and in 2007 Willum managed Valur to their first League title in 20 years and won Manager of the Season in Landsbankadeildin. He left with mutual agreement on 1 July 2009. On 29 September 2009, after the season had finished for the year, he was appointed the new manager of Keflavík.

He is the only manager who has won every single league in Iceland (4 in total), 2nd and 3rd division with Haukar, 1st division with Þróttur and the Premier League with KR and Valur.

In November 2010, Willum was appointed as the first manager for the Icelandic futsal team.

Political career
Willum has taken active part in politics with the Progressive Party. In the 2013 Icelandic parliamentary election he was elected to the Althing and served until 2016, before being elected back into parliament in 2017.

Personal life
Willum is the father of Willum Þór Willumsson, an Icelandic international footballer, as well as the father of Brynjólfur Andersen Willumsson, an Icelandic youth international footballer.

References

External links
 

1963 births
Living people
Willum Thor Thorsson
Willum Thor Thorsson
Willum Thor Thorsson
Willum Thor Thorsson
Willum Thor Thorsson
Willum Thor Thorsson
Willum Thor Thorsson
Willum Thor Thorsson
Willum Thor Thorsson
Willum Thor Thorsson
Úrvalsdeild karla (football) managers
Association football defenders
Valur (men's football) managers
Association football midfielders